Adam Peterson may refer to:

 Adam Peterson (1990s pitcher) (born 1965), former MLB pitcher for the White Sox and Padres
 Adam Peterson (tennis) (born 1974), former American tennis player
 Adam Peterson (2000s pitcher) (born 1979), former MLB pitcher for the Blue Jays

See also
Adam Pettersson, ice hockey player